The Anspach family is a Belgian noble family, established in Brussels at the beginning of the 19th century. It comes from the Republic of Geneva, from which they acquired the bourgeoisie in 1779. Before that, they originated from Schwabenheim (Swabia, Baden-Württemberg).

Members 

 Johann Wilhelm Anspach (c.1640-c. 1726), burgomaster of Schwabenheim an der Selz.
 Isaac Salomon Anspach, Protestant pastor.
 Dorothée (Dorine) Anspach, reader and governess of Duchess Louise Charlotte of Mecklenburg-Schwerin, born in Geneva on 23 July 1777 and died in Gotha in 1835, married Baron Édouard von Seebach, chamberlain of Prince of Altenburg, born in 1749 and died in Gotha in 1850 at the age of 101. Dorothée (Dorine) Anspach was ennobled by the Prince of Altenburg on 22 June 1814. She translated several books from German into French.
 François Anspach, (1784–1858), banker and politician.
 Baron Jules Anspach, burgomaster of the city of Brussels.
 Edouard Anspach (1831–1902), Plenipotentiary Minister of Belgium to Rio, Stockholm, Lisbon and Madrid.
 Eugène Anspach, Belgian politician and financier.
 Paul Anspach, Belgian fencer.
 Louis Anspach, Swiss miniaturist painter.

See also 

 Bourgeoisie of Geneva
Belgian nobility
Jules Van Dievoet
Anspach (surname)

Bibliography 

 Madame Dolez, "Les Anspach d'Est en Ouest", in : Le Parchemin, n° 240, 1985, p. 375. (Published by the Genealogical and Heraldic Office of Belgium)

References 

Belgian families
Swiss families
German families
Belgian noble families